Federal Highway 145 (Carretera Federal 145) is a Federal Highway of Mexico. The highway travels from La Tinaja, Veracruz in the north to Sayula, Veracruz in the south.

References

145